Batman Unburied is an American superhero audio drama podcast series featuring the DC Comics hero Batman. It is the first of an intended series of Spotify-produced scripted podcasts based on DC's characters.

In June 2022, the podcast was renewed for a second season.

Cast
 Winston Duke as Bruce Wayne
 Hasan Minhaj as The Riddler
 Gina Rodriguez as Barbara Gordon
 Jason Isaacs as Alfred Pennyworth
 Lance Reddick as Thomas Wayne
 Sam Witwer as the Harvester
 Emmy Raver-Lampman as Kell
 Jessica Marie Garcia as Renee Montoya
 Jim Pirri as Arnold Flass
 Toks Olagundoye as Martha Wayne
 John Rhys-Davies as Dr. Hunter
 Ashly Burch as Vicki Vale
 Justin and Griffin McElroy as Henchmen
 Travis McElroy as Officer Preslowski
 Blair Bess as Lt. Stan Kitch

Production
In June 2020, it was announced that Spotify had signed a deal with DC and Warner Bros. to produce scripted podcasts set in the DC Universe. Future installments were later revealed to be focusing on such characters as Superman, Lois Lane, Wonder Woman, Joker, Catwoman, Katana, The Riddler, Batgirl and Harley Quinn.

In September, the first podcast was announced as Batman Unburied, written by David S. Goyer.

In July 2021, Winston Duke and Jason Isaacs were announced to star as Bruce Wayne and Alfred Pennyworth, respectively. Hasan Minhaj's casting was announced in September, along with Lance Reddick, Toks Olagundoye, John Rhys-Davies and Ashly Burch.

By October, the final main cast members had been unveiled: Gina Rodriguez, Sam Witwer, Emmy Raver-Lampman, Jessica Marie Garcia and Jim Pirri.

On April 5, 2022, a trailer was revealed, alongside the release date of May 3.

International adaptations
Also on April 5, Spotify announced that in addition to the main U.S. production, the script would be adapted for eight other countries, each with its own localized cast and production crew. They are set to be released on the same date as the original English language version.

In these adaptations, the cast of Batman Unburied consists of:

Reception
Writing in The Guardian, Graeme Virtue described Batman Unburied as "Instead of bright fights in tights, this is a slow-burning psychological thriller. ... Heavy on immersive sound design and (initially, at least) light on action, it is an impressively bleak take on a familiar myth, with the added frisson of the occasional F-bomb." Virtue also noted that in May 2022, the podcast displaced The Joe Rogan Experience as the No. 1 show on Spotify's podcast chart. After the debut of the first two episodes on May 3, 2022, the series topped Spotify's charts in the U.S., Australia, Brazil, France, the U.K., Germany, Italy, Mexico and India. The same week it was No. 2 in Japan. It remained at the top or near the top of the chart throughout its five-week run.

The Los Angeles Times noted that "Due to the lack of visuals, the immersive sound design shines throughout the series. “Batman Unburied” is chock-full of authentic soundscapes that sound — in the best way possible — eerie and haunting." and that "It's also far more focused on Batman's mental psyche rather than Batman's physical brutality. It replaces action set pieces with mystery, suspense and horror."

References

External links
 

2022 podcast debuts
American podcasts
American radio dramas
Audio podcasts
Batman in other media
Comic book podcasts
Works based on DC Comics
Batman radio series
Scripted podcasts